Elliot Ackerman (born April 12, 1980) is an American author and former Marine Corps Special Operations Team Leader. He is the New York Times-bestselling author of the novels 2034: A Novel of the Next World War, Red Dress In Black and White, Waiting for Eden, Dark at the Crossing, and Green on Blue, as well as the memoirs The Fifth Act: America’s End in Afghanistan and Places and Names: On War, Revolution, and Returning. His books have received significant critical acclaim, to include nominations for the National Book Award, the Andrew Carnegie Medals in both fiction and non-fiction, and the Dayton Literary Peace Prize. He served as a White House Fellow in the Obama administration and is a Marine veteran who served in Iraq and Afghanistan. He is a contributing writer to The Atlantic and The New York Times. He was awarded the Silver Star, the Bronze Star with Valor, and a Purple Heart during his five deployments to Afghanistan and Iraq.

Early life and education
He is the son of businessman Peter Ackerman and author Joanne Leedom-Ackerman and the brother of mathematician and wrestler Nate Ackerman. At the age of nine, Ackerman and his family moved to London. The family moved back to Washington, DC, when he was fifteen.

Ackerman studied literature and history at Tufts University, where he also joined Marine Corps ROTC. He graduated summa cum laude and Phi Beta Kappa in 2003. He holds a master's degree in International Affairs from the Fletcher School of Law and Diplomacy. He also completed many of the United States military's most challenging special operations training courses.

Career

Military 
Beginning in 2003, Ackerman served eight years in the U.S. Marine Corps. He worked as both an infantry and special operations officer, initially assigned as a platoon commander in 1st Battalion, 8th Marines. He served multiple tours of duty in the Middle East and Southwest Asia. As a Marine Corps Special Operations Team Leader, Ackerman was the primary combat advisor to a 700-man Afghan commando battalion responsible for capture operations against senior Taliban leadership. He also led a 75-man platoon that aided in relief operations in post-Katrina New Orleans. He was briefly attached to the Ground Branch of the Central Intelligence Agency's Special Activities Division.

Second Battle of Fallujah 
In 2004, Ackerman led a Marine rifle platoon of 45 men during the Second Battle of Fallujah. During one night of the month-long battle, the platoon established a fighting position in a store. When the sun rose the next day, they were surrounded by insurgents. While wounded himself, Ackerman exposed himself to enemy fire to pull wounded Marines to safety and coordinated four separate medical evacuations. To save the platoon, he ordered his men to use explosives to destroy the store’s back wall.  Twenty-five men were wounded, but everyone escaped alive. Ackerman was awarded the Silver Star for his “heroics in the battle” and a Purple Heart for his wounds.

USA Today reported that Ackerman was potentially the assault force commander of a group of US Marines that carried out a raid that led to the death of an estimated 33 to 92 civilians in Azizabad, Afghanistan, in August 2008.  According to USA Today's investigation, the marines had been set up by an informant who provided them with false intelligence and there were no Taliban in the compound. Ackerman was one of the people who worked with other veterans, journalists, and activists to help evacuate as many Afghan allies as possible in 2021, during the U.S. withdrawal. 

Ackerman received the Bronze Star for Valor in 2008 while leading a Marine special operations team in Afghanistan. He left the Marine Corps in 2009 as a captain.

Political 
Ackerman served as Chief Operating Officer of Americans Elect, a political organization known primarily for its efforts to stage a national online primary for the 2012 US Presidential Election. As one of its officers, Ackerman was interviewed extensively, notably on NPR's Talk of the Nation.

Ackerman has served on the board of the Afghan Scholars Initiative and as an advisor to the No Greater Sacrifice scholarship fund. He is a lifetime member of the Council on Foreign Relations.

In 2012 to 2013, Ackerman served as a White House Fellow in the Obama Administration.

Author 

Ackerman has written and published five novels (Green on Blue, Dark at the Crossing, Waiting for Eden, Red Dress in Black & White, and 2034: A Novel of the Next World War) and two memoirs (Places and Names: On War, Revolution, and Returning and The Fifth Act: America’s End in Afghanistan). His fiction and essays have also appeared in The New Yorker, The Atlantic, The New Republic, The New York Times Magazine, Esquire, Time, Harper's Magazine, Ecotone and others (see Selected Bibliography). He was a writer for Esquire, and is also a contributor to The Daily Beast.

Green on Blue 
Ackerman's first novel, Green on Blue, was published February 17, 2015 by Scribner. Tom Bissell of the New York Times Book Review said, 
Like all novels written in skilled, unadorned prose about men and women of action, this novel will probably be compared to Hemingway's work. In this case, however, the comparison seems unusually apt ... Elliot Ackerman has done something brave as a writer and even braver as a soldier: He has touched, for real, the culture and soul of his enemy. The Los Angeles Review of Books describes the novel as a "radical departure from veterans writing thus far" due to his choice of a first-person narrator, the lowly Aziz, a poor soldier in a local militia. The Stars and Stripes review described Green on Blue and Phil Klay's Redeployment as carrying "the sting of authenticity and the sensory expression of experiences lived". Green on Blue was a New York Times Book Review Editors' Choice.

Dark at the Crossing 
Ackerman's second novel Dark at the Crossing,  published January 24, 2017, by Alfred A. Knopf, was a finalist for the National Book Award in 2017. In a starred review Library Journal wrote, "Here is a thriller, psychological fiction, political intrigue, and even a love story all wrapped into a stunningly realistic and sometimes horrifying package. Put Ackerman on the A-list." In the New York Times Book Review the novelist Lawrence Osborne wrote, "One could argue that the most vital literary terrain in America's overseas wars is now occupied not by journalists but by novelists ... Elliot Ackerman is certainly one of those novelists ... He has created people who are not the equivalents of the locally exotic subjects in your average NPR story, and he has used them to populate a fascinating and topical novel." Dark at the Crossing was noted as one of the best books of the year by the Washington Post, NPR, Christian Science Monitor, [[Military Times]], Vogue, and Bloomberg and was a New York Times Book Review Editors' Choice. Ackerman was a featured author at the Miami Book Fair in 2017.

 Waiting for Eden 
Ackerman's third novel Waiting for Eden was published September 25, 2018, by Alfred A. Knopf. The book was nominated for the Andrew Carnegie Medal for Excellence in Fiction, and it won the Marine Corps Heritage Foundation's James Webb Award. Author Anthony Swofford wrote in The New York Times Book Review, "Masterly ... Brilliant ... In his short novel, Ackerman accomplishes what a mountain of maximalist books have rarely delivered over tens of thousands of pages and a few decades: He makes pure character-based literary art, dedicated only to deeply human storytelling ... Cusk's Outline trilogy and Jenny Offill's Dept. of Speculation have created similarly shimmering portraits of humans at rest and fury ... Ackerman explore[s] conflicted, confused true love in such elegant and humane ways that you will come to question everything you think you know about the meanings of romance and fidelity ... The micro-level power of his unadorned and direct prose lies in no less than an attempt to contain and dramatize the darkness and light of our souls ... To identify this book as a novel seems inadequate: Waiting for Eden is a sculpture chiseled from the rarest slab of life experience." The novel was one of the best books of the year on Amazon, NPR, and the Washington Post and was a New York Times Book Review Editors' Choice.

 Places and Names: On War, Revolution, and Returning 
Ackerman's fourth book Places and Names: On War, Revolution, and Returning was published June 11, 2019, by Penguin Press. The memoir was nominated for the 2020 Andrew Carnegie Medal for Excellence in Non-fiction. Time magazine named it a must-read book of 2019 and said, "In Places and Names, perhaps the most striking war memoir of the year, Ackerman attempts to make sense of the reasons he served (personal and geopolitical), the people he met, the kinship he felt and the reckonings he has since confronted. Places and Names is as clean and spare in its prose as it is sharp and unsparing in timely observation." It was also a New York Times Book Review Editors' Choice.

 Red Dress in Black & White 
Ackerman's fifth book Red Dress in Black & White was published May 26, 2020, by Alfred A. Knopf. The novel was nominated for the 2021 Andrew Carnegie Medal for Excellence in Fiction and was also a New York Times Book Review Editors' Choice. Author Joan Silber wrote in The New York Times Book Review, "Having worked so impressively at overturning the conventions of war fiction, Ackerman has now written a novel without a single soldier in it ... He's decided on a different sort of drama, a territory of intrigue and tricks, entirely absorbing, with other sources of suspense ... Ackerman's rich knowledge of Turkey is evident on every page."

 2034: A Novel of the Next World War 2034: A Novel of the Next World War is jointly authored by Admiral James G. Stavridis, USN (Ret.), and was released on March 9, 2021 by Penguin Press.

 The Fifth Act: America’s End in Afghanistan 
In The Fifth Act: America’s End in Afghanistan, Ackerman recounts his life as an infantry officer on combat missions, his decision to leave the military, and the efforts to get Afghans out of the country in 2021 when the U.S. pulled out. The Fifth Act was published by Penguin Press in August 2022.

 Articles, Essays, and Short Stories 
For a period of time, Ackerman lived in Istanbul and worked as a reporter covering the Syrian Civil War. His article "Why Bringing Back the Draft Could Stop America's Forever Wars" was featured on the cover of the October 21, 2019, issue of Time magazine. 

Awards and honors

 Military awards 

 2004 Silver Star (Iraq)
 2004 Purple Heart (Iraq)
 2008 Bronze Star for Valor (Afghanistan)

 Writing awards 

 2015 Dayton Literary Peace Prize, finalist (Green on Blue)
 2015 Amazon Best Book of the Year (Green on Blue)
 2015 New York Times Book Review Editors' Choice (Green on Blue)
 2017 National Book Award, finalist (Dark at the Crossing)
 2017 Amazon Best Book of the Year (Dark at the Crossing)
 2017 New York Times Book Review Editors' Choice (Dark at the Crossing)
 2018 Andrew Carnegie Medal for Excellence in Fiction, longlist (Waiting for Eden)
 2018 Indie Next Best Book of the Year Award, finalist (Waiting for Eden)
 2018 Publishers Weekly Books of the Year (Waiting for Eden)
 2018 Amazon Best Book of the Year (Waiting for Eden)
 2018 Washington Post Notable Book (Waiting for Eden)
 2018 New York Times Book Review Editors' Choice (Waiting for Eden)
 2019 Marine Corps Heritage Foundation James Webb Award (Waiting for Eden)
 2019 Andrew Carnegie Medal for Excellence in Non-Fiction, longlist (Places and Names: On War, Revolution, and Returning)
 2019 New York Times Book Review Editors' Choice (Places and Names: On War, Revolution, and Returning)
 2019 Time magazine Best Books of the Year (Places and Names: On War, Revolution, and Returning)
2020 Andrew Carnegie Medal for Excellence in Non-Fiction, longlist (Red Dress in Black & White)
 2020 New York Times Book Review Editors' Choice (Red Dress in Black & White)

Select bibliography

 Magazines 
 "Why Bringing Back the Draft Could Stop America's Forever Wars". Time October 21, 2019
 "Goodbye, My Brother". Esquire March 23, 2017
 "A West Point Literature Professor's Inspiring Plea for Creativity in Our Military". The New Republic October 27, 2014
 "Hometown Heroes". War, Literature and the Arts October 3, 2014
 "Pictures from My War". The New Yorker September 21, 2014
 "Watching ISIS Come to Power Again". The Daily Beast September 7, 2014
 "Charlie Balls". Ecotone, Volume 9, Number 1, Fall 2013, pp. 81–90
 "Airstrikes and the U.S. Strategy to Combat ISIS ". The Daily Beast August 8, 2014
 "The Islamic State's Strategy Was Years In the Making". The New Republic  August 8, 2014
 "Waiting Out the Afghan War". The New Yorker August 6, 2014
 "Syria's War Poets". The Atlantic July 28, 2014
 "Four Hundred Grand". The Daily Beast July 6, 2014
 "A Black Flag and a Rainbow Flag". The New Yorker July 2, 2014
 "Watching ISIS Flourish Where We Once Fought". The New Yorker June 17, 2014
 "The Wounds Caused By Friendly Fire". The New Yorker June 12, 2014
 "The Bored Horsemen of the Apocalypse". The Daily Beast June 9, 2014
 "I Was a Marine in Afghanistan: Bowe Bergdahl Haunted Us All". The New Republic June 4, 2014
 "Extraordinary Bravery on the Streets of Fallujah". The New Republic May 25, 2014
 "The US Marine Who Disappeared in Syria". The Daily Beast May 3, 2014
 "A Man to Believe In". The Daily Beast March 5, 2014
 "Joyce Carol Oates Goes to War". The Daily Beast January 30, 2014
 "I Fought at Fallujah. Here's What I Think About When People Ask If It Was Worth It". The New Republic January 13, 2014
 "The Case for Female SEALs". The Atlantic December 24, 2013
 "Greg Baxter's 'The Apartment'". The Daily Beast  December 12, 2013

 Books Green on Blue: A Novel. Scribner, 2015. Dark at the Crossing: A Novel. Knopf, 2017. Waiting for Eden. Knopf, 2018. Places and Names: On War, Revolution, and Returning. Penguin Press, 2019. 
  Red Dress in Black & White. Knopf, 2020. 
 With Admiral James G. Stavridis, USN (Ret.) 2034: A Novel of the Next World War. Penguin Press, 2021. 
 The Fifth Act: America's End in Afghanistan. Penguin Press, 2022. ''

References

External links

 
 

1980 births
Living people
21st-century American male writers
21st-century American non-fiction writers
21st-century American short story writers
American chief operating officers
American expatriates in England
American male non-fiction writers
American male novelists
American male short story writers
Recipients of the Silver Star
American military writers
The Fletcher School at Tufts University alumni
United States Marine Corps officers
United States Marine Corps personnel of the Iraq War
United States Marine Corps personnel of the War in Afghanistan (2001–2021)
War writers
White House Fellows